Hossein Ali-Bayat (1922-11 April 1979) was an Iranian politician and soldier of the Pahlavi era and a Member of Parliament In Zarjan (1975–1978)

Link 

 https://www.iranrights.org//farsi/memorial-case--3773.php
 http://rc.majlis.ir/fa/parliament_member/show/769382
 https://ir-psri.com/?Page=ViewArticle&ArticleID=2438&SP=Farsi

Imperial Iranian Armed Forces timsars
1979 deaths
People from Fars Province
1922 births